The 1974 RE-PO 500K was an endurance race for Group C Touring Cars. The race, which was the fifth round of the 1974 Australian Manufacturers' Championship, was the fourth annual "Phillip Island 500K".

The race was won by Holden Dealer Team driver Colin Bond driving a Holden Torana. Bond finishing a lap ahead of the Ford Falcon (XB) of Murray Carter. Brothers Rod and Russ McRae finished three laps behind Bond in a Holden Torana to take third.

Class structure
Cars competed in four classes:
Class A : Up 1300cc
Class B : 1301–2000cc
Class C : 2001 – 3000cc
Class D : More than 3000cc

Race results
Race results were as follows:

Note:
 The Mazda RX-3 of Tony Farrell was excluded from the results due to a modification to the half shafts. An appeal was successful and the car was re-instated.

References

CAMS Manual of Motor Sport, 1974
The Australian Racing History of Ford, © 1989
The Official Racing History of Holden, © 1988

Phillip Island 500
Repo 500K
Motorsport at Phillip Island
November 1974 sports events in Australia